Salvatore Commesso (born March 28, 1975) is an Italian professional road bicycle racer who most recently rode for UCI Professional Continental team Preti Mangimi.

He was born in Torre del Greco, Campania, and turned professional in 1998. That year he came in third in the Grand Prix Suisse and the Giro del Capo. He won the Italian National Championships and Stage 13 of the 1999 Tour de France in 1999.

Commesso won Stage 18 of the 2000 Tour de France and won the points competition in the Volta a Portugal in 2001.

In 2002, he again won the Italian Championship, as well as the Trofeo Matteotti and the Criterium d'Abruzzo.

He rode for the  team from 1998 to 2004. In 2005, the team merged with Lampre, with whom he came in second in the Giro del Veneto.

He rode for Lampre in the 2006 Tour de France and came in second in Stage 14.

Major results

1998 – 
Turned professional.
 3rd, Grand Prix Suisse
 3rd, Giro del Capo
1999 – Saeco
 1st, Stage 13 – Tour de France
  Italian National Road Race Championship
 Gran Premio Nobili Rubinetterie
2000 – Saeco
 1st, Stage 18 – Tour de France
2001 – Saeco
 Points Classification – Volta a Portugal
2002 – Saeco
  Italian National Road Race Championship
 Trofeo Matteotti
 Criterium d'Abruzzo
2003 – Saeco
2004 – Saeco
2005 – Lampre–Caffita
2006 – Lampre–Fondital
 2nd, Stage 14 – Tour de France  (Stage Combativity Award)
2007
 Tirreno–Adriatico
1st  Mountains classification

References

External links
Interview on cyclingnews.com

1975 births
Living people
Italian male cyclists
Italian Tour de France stage winners
People from Torre del Greco
Sportspeople from the Province of Naples
Cyclists from Campania